Barpeta Road railway station is a main railway station in Barpeta district, Assam. Its code is BPRD. It serves Barpeta Road city. The station consists of 2 platforms. This Railway Station was constructed in British Era.[]

Trains
Major Trains:

 Agartala–Anand Vihar Terminal Tejas Rajdhani Express
 Silchar-Coimbatore Superfast Express
Guwahati - Sir M. Visvesvaraya Terminal, Bangalore Superfast Express
Silchar-Thiruvananthapuram Aronai Superfast Express
Lokmanya Tilak Terminus - Dibrugarh Express
Lokmanya Tilak Terminus–Guwahati Express
Sealdah–Agartala Kanchenjunga Express
Dibrugarh-Howrah Kamrup Express via Guwahati
Dibrugarh–Howrah Kamrup Express Via Rangapara North
Delhi-Dibrugarh Brahmaputra Mail
Guwahati - Bikaner Express
Sealdah–Silchar Kanchenjunga Express
Guwahati - Barmer Express
Kamakhya - Jodhpur, Bhagat Ki Kothi Express
Kamakhya - Puri Express (via Adra)
 Alipurduar–Lumding Intercity Express

References

Railway stations in Barpeta district
Rangiya railway division